Kautokeino may refer to:

Places
Kautokeino (also known as: Guovdageaidnu), a municipality in Finnmark county, Norway
Kautokeino (village) (also known as: Guovdageaidnu), a village in Kautokeino municipality, Norway
Kautokeino river, also known as Altaelva, a river in Finnmark county, Norway
Kautokeino Airport, the airport in Kautokeino municipalityin Finnmark county, Norway
Kautokeino Church, a church in Kautokeino municipality in Finnmark county, Norway

Other
Kautokeino rebellion, a revolt in the village of Kautokeino in northern Norway in 1852
The Kautokeino Rebellion, a 2008 film based on the true story of the Kautokeino rebellion in 1852
Kautokeino IL, a sports club in Finnmark county, Norway